Datuk Peter Joinod Mojuntin, PGDK (11 October 1939, in Kampung Hungab, Donggongon, Penampang – 6 June 1976, in Sembulan, Kota Kinabalu) was a politician in the Malaysian state of Sabah and Minister of Municipal Administration in the government of Tun Fuad Stephens. He died along with other politicians in the Double Six Plane Crash in Kota Kinabalu.

Life
Datuk Peter Joinod Mojuntin was born on 11 October 1939 as the third child of rice farmers, Paul Mojuntin Matanul (1907-1971), an ethnic Kadazan and his wife, a half-bred, mixed-blood Hakka Chinese woman of Sino-Native descent, Magdalene Minjaim Lim (1909-1994) in Kampung Hungab, Donggongon, Penampang. After obtaining his education at both St. Michael's School in Donggongon, Penampang (1946-1954) and the Sacred Heart Secondary School in Tanjung Aru, Jesselton (1955-1957), he began his professional, working life as a junior teacher at St. Michael's School, Donggongon, Penampang, his alma mater, when he graduated from secondary school in 1957 at the age of 18 and served only for 2 years until the year 1959, when he turned 20, as he resigned personally after getting another job offer. After that, he worked at a newspaper known as the North Borneo News and The Sabah Times (now known today as the New Sabah Times), with Donald Stephens as the owner and the editor-in-chief of that publication, working as a columnist and a part-time journalist under the latter's mentorship, he then later worked as the Managing Director of Nabahu Corp. Sdn. Bhd., a local co-operative company. 
On 9 May 1964, he married Datin Nancy Mary Mobijohn (born 1944), who was the daughter of a local politician and a former teacher-cum-colleague of his named Datuk Seri Panglima Lidwin Anthony Mobijohn (1921-2002) and wife, Datin Seri Panglima Nora Joguim Sipanil (1923-2008), also hailing from the same village and the couple had five children, three boys and two girls, including Donald Peter Mojuntin (born 1965). 
In addition, he served as the Chairman of the Penampang District Council for two non-consecutive terms, from 1965 to 1971 and again from 1973 to 1975.
Throughout his life, Mojuntin was active in various organisations of the Kadazan. First, he was the president of the youth organisation United Sabah Kadazan Youth Association and then from 1965 to 1973, he was President of the Kadazan Cultural Association (KCA) and in 1975, he became their patron.

Political career
Mojuntin's political career began in 1962 as General Secretary of the United National Kadazan Organisation (UNKO). From 1963 to 1964, he was a member of the Malaysian Parliament. In 1967, he was elected as a deputy in the Legislative Assembly of Sabah, he retained his seat there continuously until his death in 1976. From 1971 to 1973, he was appointed as the Assistant Minister of Industrial Development of the state of Sabah. With the re-election of Tun Fuad Stephens in April 1976, he became the Minister of Housing and Local Government of the state of Sabah. Forty-four days later, he died in a plane crash.

Death
On 6 June 1976, Peter Mojuntin together with Tun Fuad Stephens and several cabinet members aboard a flight from Labuan to Kota Kinabalu were killed in the Double Six Crash about 2 km from the Kota Kinabalu International Airport. Immediately after the disaster there were conspiracy theories about the cause of the crash because of how loud the crash was.

The location of the crash is commemorated with the Double Six Monument, a memorial, marked with a stone obelisk that was erected shortly after the accident. The monument is located in Sembulan district near the Grace Garden building complex in Kota Kinabalu, Sabah Jalan Coastal Highway leading to Sutera Harbour Resort. Peter Mojuntin was buried in the churchyard of St Michael Church, Donggongon, Penampang.

Legacy

Mojuntin belonged to the political opponents of Tun Mustapha.

The expulsion of missionaries and church personnel which made way for the course of Islamisation in Sabah was strongly criticised by him.

Against the raids, arrests, harassment and deportation of the priests, he personally protested to Prime Minister, Tun Abdul Razak.

Mojuntin's position is documented in the published biography of Bernard Sta Maria and for the alleged defamation of the then-Chief Minister of Sabah, Tun Mustapha, the book was banned by the Malaysian Home Ministry in June 1978.

Mojuntin and his life is commemorated in a statue in Donggongon, Penampang.

Additionally, SMK Datuk Peter Mojuntin, a secondary school located in Dongongon, Penampang district was named after him, in honour of his legacy and contributions to the people of the Penampang district.

References

Malaysian Roman Catholics
Victims of aviation accidents or incidents in Malaysia
Malaysian educators
People from Sabah
1939 births
Kadazan-Dusun people
1976 deaths
Members of the Sabah State Legislative Assembly
Malaysian schoolteachers
Sabah state ministers
Malaysian journalists
20th-century journalists